General Webster may refer to:

George D. Webster (USMC) (1919–1992), U.S. Marine Corps brigadier general
Joseph Dana Webster (1811–1876), Union Army brigadier general and brevet major general
Robert M. Webster (1892–1972), U.S. Air Force major general
William G. Webster (born 1951), U.S. Army lieutenant general

See also
Attorney General Webster (disambiguation)